Final Four College Basketball is a video game published in 1985 by Lance Haffner Games.

Gameplay
Final Four College Basketball is a game in which college basketball is simulated in a text-only game featuring 230 teams.

Reception
Rick Teverbaugh reviewed Final Four College Basketball and Basketball: The Pro Game for Computer Gaming World, and stated that "Overall, it is a well thought-out pair of games that certainly fills a void in the computer gaming world."

References

External links
Review in Compute!
Article in Ahoy!
Article in PC Games

Basketball video games